The Bureau of Ocean Energy Management (BOEM) is an agency within the United States Department of the Interior, established in 2010 by Secretarial Order. BOEM and its sister agency, the Bureau of Safety and Environmental Enforcement are the agencies to which this responsibility is delegated. They exercise the oil, gas, and renewable energy-related management functions formerly under the purview of the Minerals Management Service (MMS). Specifically, BOEM activities involve resource evaluation, planning, and leasing.

The Outer Continental Shelf Lands Act (OCSLA) states: "...the outer Continental Shelf is a vital national resource reserve held by the Federal Government for the public, which should be made available for expeditious and orderly development, subject to environmental safeguards, in a manner which is consistent with the maintenance of competition and other national needs."

Directors
The agency's first director, serving from June 2010 to May 2014, was Tommy Beaudreau. The second director was Abigail Ross Hopper, serving from January 2015 to January 2017. From 2017 to 2021, deputy director Walter Cruickshank served as the acting director.

From February 2021 to January 2023, the director was Amanda Lefton. In an announcement with United States Secretary of Energy Jennifer Granholm on April 27, 2022, Lefton said that her agency would focus on efforts to promote offshore wind projects, saying that BOEM would work to "inspire confidence and demonstrate commitment" for lease planning and calling it her "number-one priority," National Fisherman reported. In January 2023, Lefton announced her resignation, effective January 19.

, the director is Elizabeth Klein.

Ocean floor surveys
A function inherited from the MMS is the review of nearly 1,700 planned wells and pipelines every year. The BOEM keeps records of shipwrecks, to ensure the Nation's important historical sites are protected. These shipwrecks, particularly when over fifty years old, may be eligible for listing on the National Register of Historic Places, and any new wells or pipelines have to be studied for their potential effect on archaeological sites on the outer continental shelf.

List of shipwrecks
The BOEM maintains a list of shipwrecks and the location.
Northern Eagle (Built 1857) was a fishing schooner lost 1908-03-01
Carrie Strong (Lost 1916)
W.H. Marston (Lost 1927)
Western Empire was abandoned during a hurricane on September 18, 1875. Further research has ruled out the wreck as the Western Empire, and it is now believed to be a naval ship (now referred to as the BOEMRE Vessel ID No. 359) that may have been used as a merchant vessel.
Nokomis (Lost 1905)

World War II shipwrecks
There were over 100 attacks on ships in the Gulf of Mexico by German U-boats. Several were listed by the MMS and  maintained by the BOEM.
SS Gulfoil (Built 1912, lost 1942-05-17), sunk by German submarine U-506
SS Gulfpenn (Built 1921, lost 1942-05-13), sunk by German submarine U-506 
SS Robert E. Lee (Built 1924, lost 1942-07-30), sunk by German submarine U-166
SS Alcoa Puritan (Built 1941, lost 1942-06-05), sunk by German submarine U-507
SS Carrabulle (Built 1920, lost 1942-05-26), sunk by German submarine U-106. 
SS Amapala (Built 1924, lost 1942-05-16), sunk by German submarine U-507

The only known German U-boat to be sunk in the Gulf is U-166. After sinking the SS Robert E. Lee the United States Navy patrol craft PC-566 reported hitting and sinking the submarine. This was questioned and the sinking was attributed to a United States Coast Guard Grumman G-44 Widgeon, that reported an attack over 100 miles away, thought to be the U-166. In 2001 the wreckage of U-166 was identified near the wreckage of the Robert E. Lee and in 2014 the record was set straight that PC-566 actually sunk U-166. In 2014 the position,  was designated a war grave.

See also

Title 30 of the Code of Federal Regulations
Worst Case Discharge
Wind power in the United States
Second Happy Time

References

External links 
Bureau of Ocean Energy Management Official website
Bureau of Ocean Energy Management in the Federal Register

Government agencies established in 2011
United States Department of the Interior agencies
Oil wells
Natural resources agencies in the United States
Environmental agencies in the United States
2011 establishments in the United States